Separations is the third studio album by English rock band Pulp, released on 19 June 1992 by Fire Records.

Release and aftermath

Recorded in 1989, it was belatedly released in 1992 by the independent record label Fire, having already been released in France in 1991 on Rosebud Records. The songs on the second half of the album range between electronic synthpop and experimental acid house styles, while the first half contains songs more typical of Pulp's late 80s music.

The album was reissued and remastered by Fire in 2012 along with 1983's It and 1987's Freaks. This re-release took several delays as the first stated release date was 8 August 2011 while the albums finally came out on 13 February 2012. An announcement in the interim stated that the albums would be remastered with new bonus tracks to be added to the track listings as well as new artwork and liner notes from music journalist Everett True.

This re-release gives an opportunity to hear "Death Comes to Town" which was previously released in 2005 only on CD that accompanied Sheffield journalist Martin Lilleker's book Beats Working for a Living. This 22-song CD featured rare tracks from some of the bands featured in the book.

"Death Goes to the Disco" and "Is This House?" are remixes of "Death Comes To Town" and "This House Is Condemned" respectively.

The bonus track "Is This House?" on the 2012 edition is labelled incorrectly. This track is taken from "My Legendary Girlfriend" single, where two remixes of the song "This House Is Condemned" by Parrot & Winston can be found, but it is in fact the remix titled simply "This House Is Condemned (Remix)"

Track listing
All music written by Pulp and lyrics written by Jarvis Cocker, except where noted.

Personnel
Pulp
 Jarvis Cocker – vocals, guitar
 Steve Mackey – bass
 Candida Doyle – keyboards
 Nick Banks – drums
 Russell Senior – guitar, violin, lead vocals on "This House Is Condemned"

Additional personnel
 Alan Fisch – engineering
 Martyn Broadhead – sleeve design basis
 Alex Hornsby – layout, additional design

Notes

References

External links

 Separations (2012 remaster) at YouTube (streamed copy where licensed)
 

1992 albums
Fire Records (UK) albums
Pulp (band) albums